Consuelo Lord Cezon (March 28, 1925 – February 26, 2004), known professionally as Connie Cezon, was an American film actress. She made over 30 film and television appearances between 1951 and 1964.

Early years
Born in Oakland, California, Cezon attended the Hollywood Community School of the Theater as a child. She has a younger brother, Ricardo.

Movies and television
Cezon appeared in Ken Murray's Blackouts. She played a blonde "gold digger" in several Three Stooges films. Her flair for physical comedy helped, and she made memorable appearances in Corny Casanovas, Up in Daisy's Penthouse, and Tricky Dicks. After leaving the Columbia shorts department, Cezon had a recurring role as Perry Mason's receptionist Gertrude "Gertie" Lade on Perry Mason between 1957 and 1964. She also worked as Bette Davis' stand in/double, most notably in the 1964 thriller Dead Ringer.

After retiring from the screen in 1966, Cezon operated and ran a cat-boarding service in Los Angeles called Connie's Kitty Castle.

Though her surname was spelled "Cezan" in the Three Stooges films, it appears as "Cezon" in all her other appearances. Cezon confirmed that the correct spelling is the latter.

Death
Cezon died on February 26, 2004, in Glendale, California, of complications from breast cancer surgery. She was interred alongside her parents, Pedro and Mireio, in the Great Mausoleum at Forest Lawn Memorial Park in Glendale.

Selected filmography
 Boston Blackie (1951)
 Outlaw Women (1952) - One of Uncle Barney's Girls
 Corny Casanovas (1952) - Mabel
 So You Want To Go To A Convention (1952) - Fortune Teller (uncredited)
 The Abbott and Costello Show (1953) - Tunnel Girl / Stella
 Up in Daisy's Penthouse (1953) - Daisy Flowers
 Tricky Dicks (1953) - Slick Chick
 Playgirl (1954) - Girl (uncredited)
 Gang Busters (1952-1955)
 Adventures of Rin Tin Tin (1955) - Charlotte / Mollie McCoy
 Female Jungle (1955) - Connie
 Hot Stuff (1956) - Uranian Officer (uncredited)
 Rusty Romeos (1957) - Mabel
 Perry Mason (1957–1964, 17 episodes) - Gertie Lade (final appearance)
 Triple Crossed (1959) - Belle (uncredited)
 Dead Ringer (1964) - (stand-in: Bette Davis during twin scenes - uncredited)

References

External links
 
 

1925 births
2004 deaths
American film actresses
20th-century American actresses
21st-century American women